Cantagalo–Pavão–Pavãozinho is a bairro (neighborhood), a grouping of two favelas in the South Zone of Rio de Janeiro, Brazil, located between the bairros of Ipanema and Copacabana. As of 2010, it has circa 9,500 inhabitants.

Cantagalo and Pavão–Pavãozinho were well known for violence, especially that associated with drug wars. However, beginning in December 2009, the bairro was pacified by a then-newly formed Pacifying Police Unit (UPP). On 30 June 2010, the Rubem Braga Complex was inaugurated in it, composed of two towers, an overlook (named by the inhabitants of the region "Mirante da Paz", or the "Peace Overlook") and two lifts linking the favela to the General Osório Metro Station.

The Rio de Janeiro section of the 2009 first-person shooter video game Call of Duty: Modern Warfare 2 was fashioned after the favela complex. Gospel music singer Fernanda Brum has a song entitled "Pavão Pavãozinho"; it was inspired by and had its music video shot at the favela.

References

Favelas
Neighbourhoods in Rio de Janeiro (city)